Dubravko is a masculine given name of Slavic origin, derived from dubrava meaning "oak grove". The name can refer to:

 Dubravko Bužimski Jelačić, Croatian writer  
 Dubravko Detoni, Croatian composer, pianist and writer
 Dubravko Jovanović, Serbian actor
 Dubravko Kolinger, German football defender
 Dubravko Ledić, former Bosnian football midfielder
 Dubravko Mataković (canoeist), Croatian slalom canoer
 Dubravko Mataković (illustrator), Croatian comics artist
 Dubravko Merlić, Croatian television journalist, producer and author
 Dubravko Pavličić, Croatian football player
 Dubravko Posavec, Bosnian ice hockey player
 Dubravko Šimenc, Croatian water polo player
 Dubravko Škiljan, Croatian linguist
 Dubravko Tešević, Bosnian football player

See also
 
 Dubravka, the feminine version

Slavic masculine given names
Croatian masculine given names
Serbian masculine given names